Sins of Empire is the first book in the flintlock fantasy trilogy Gods of Blood and Powder written by American author Brian McClellan. It was published by Orbit Books in 2017. A sequel titled Wrath of Empire was released on May 15, 2018.

Plot
Ten years after the events of The Powder Mage trilogy, the Lady Chancellor of the young nation of Fatrasta must use her iron will and secret police force against the unrest of a suppressed population and the machinations of powerful empires. 

Michel Bravis, a spy in all but name, a convicted war hero called Ben Styke, and Lady Vlora Flint - general of a mercenary company - must work together to purge the insurrection that threatens Landfall. Loyalties are tested, revealed and destroyed, while old powers are again discovered and will soon be a bigger challenge than Landfall's current worries.

See also 
 The Powder Mage trilogy, also by Brian McClellan:
Promise of Blood
The Crimson Campaign
 The Autumn Republic
 Wrath of Empire, the second book in the Gods of Blood and Powder trilogy
 Blood of Empire, the third book in the trilogy

External links 
 Official website of Brian McClellan

References 

2017 fantasy novels
2017 American novels
American fantasy novels
Orbit Books books